General elections were held in Trinidad and Tobago in 1938.

Electoral system
The Legislative Council had 12 official members (civil servants), six nominated members, seven elected members and the Governor, who served as the legislature's speaker. The seven elected members were elected from single-member constituencies.

The franchise was limited to people who owned property in their constituency with a rateable value of $60 (or owned property elsewhere with a rateable value of $48) and tenants or lodgers who paid the same sums in rent. All voters were required to understand spoken English. Anyone who had received poor relief within the most recent six months before election day was disqualified from voting.

The restrictions on candidates were more severe, with candidature limited to men that lived in their constituency, were literate in English, and owned property worth at least $12,000 or from which they received at least $960 in rent a year. For candidates who had not lived in their constituency for at least a year, the property values were doubled.

Results

References

Trinidad
1938 in Trinidad and Tobago
Elections in Trinidad and Tobago